Joseph Trapanese (born 1984) is an American composer, arranger, and producer. He works in the production of music for films, television, records, theater, concerts, and interactive media.

Early life and education
Raised in Jersey City, New Jersey, Trapanese attended Dr. Ronald E. McNair Academic High School before moving on to the Manhattan School of Music.

Film and television music

Early career 
Trapanese began his composing career by collaborating with Daft Punk (Thomas Bangalter and Guy-Manuel de Homem-Christo) on the soundtrack for the Walt Disney Pictures film Tron: Legacy. His arrangements for the soundtrack have been described as "resolutely grand" and "stirring... ominous, hypnotic". The BBC described the work as "a sophisticated integration of acoustic and electronic instrumentation... majestic… rich, solemn tones… saturnine orchestration and a muscular rhythm”.

2011–present 

Trapanese has gone on to compose numerous projects including Disney XD's animated series Tron: Uprising, Sony Pictures Classics' The Raid: Redemption (co-composed with Mike Shinoda of Linkin Park), Sony Pictures Television's original web series The Bannen Way, the independent feature Mamitas (featured at the 2011 Los Angeles Film Festival), and numerous scores for live action and animated films from UCLA's School of Theater, Film and Television.  Trapanese contributed musical arrangements to Percy Jackson & the Olympians: The Lightning Thief, What Happens in Vegas and Traitor.  Alongside composer Daniel Licht, Trapanese produced and orchestrated the scores for seasons 3 and 4 of Showtime's original series Dexter, and provided orchestrations for seasons 5 and 6. The 2012 teaser trailer for Iron Man 3 features Trapanese's composition Something to Fight For.

His career eventually lead to working on major studio feature films working solo and alongside recording artists.  Some of his well known credits include Universal Studios's Straight Outta Compton, Lionsgate Films's The Divergent Series: Insurgent, Sony Pictures Classics' The Raid 2, and Universal Studios's Oblivion (co-composed with Anthony Gonzalez of M83).

In 2017 he scored the Sony Pictures feature Only the Brave, his third collaboration with director Joseph Kosinski, and co-scored the 20th Century Fox musical The Greatest Showman alongside composer John Debney.  On that film he produced several of the chart-topping songs from the film written by Oscar-winning duo Justin Paul and Benj Pasek.

Music collaboration with artists 
Following his collaborations with Daft Punk on Tron: Legacy, Anthony Gonzalez (M83) on Oblivion, and Mike Shinoda (Linkin Park) on The Raid: Redemption, Trapanese continues to work with artists in film scoring, album production, and live events.

On August 7, 2015 Dr. Dre released his long-awaited third album Compton which featured string arrangements by Trapanese and Jennifer Hammond.  They were conducted by Trapanese at the Straight Outta Compton scoring sessions at the Sony Pictures Studios scoring stage in Culver City.

On February 27, 2015 Kelly Clarkson released her seventh album Piece by Piece which featured an orchestra arranged and conducted by Trapanese recorded at EastWest Studios in Hollywood.  He collaborated with producers Greg Kurstin, Jesse Shatkin, and Jason Halbert on the project.

On September 22, 2013, Trapanese performed with M83 at the Hollywood Bowl as conductor of the Hollywood Bowl Orchestra.   For the concert, Trapanese arranged new orchestral material for songs from Before The Dawn Heals Us, Saturdays=Youth, Hurry Up, We're Dreaming, and Oblivion.   He also arranged and conducted an orchestra for M83's show at Central Park Summerstage in New York City on August 8, 2012.

Released on October 25, 2013, by RCA Records, Kelly Clarkson's Wrapped in Red features an orchestra arranged and conducted by Trapanese.  Produced by Greg Kurstin, it is Clarkson's first Christmas-themed release, featuring cover versions of various Christmas standards in addition to original material.  As part of the album's promotion, on October 30, 2013, Trapanese led the orchestra for Kelly Clarkson's Cautionary Christmas Music Tale at The Venetian Las Vegas, which was broadcast on NBC on December 11, 2013.

Trapanese collaborated with Active Child on the arrangement of "Silhouette" (featuring Ellie Goulding) for his 2013 EP Rapor.  In addition to the album, he provided new string and choir arrangements for his performances in Melbourne, London, New York City, Chicago, and Los Angeles.

For 2012's The Bourne Legacy, Trapanese worked with Moby on a new orchestral version of his "Extreme Ways".

On October 18, 2011, M83's double-disc album Hurry Up, We're Dreaming released with five tracks arranged by Trapanese.  Trapanese's work can be heard on "Intro", "Wait", "Soon, My Friend", "My Tears Are Becoming a Sea", and "Outro".

Trapanese co-wrote and co-produced the song "Do or Die" with 3OH!3 from their album Omens.

Music for live theater 
The music Trapanese has produced for theater is performed primarily in New York City, most notably in productions by The Actors Company Theatre.  Recent productions that he has provided music for include T. S. Eliot's The Cocktail Party, Arthur Miller's Incident at Vichy, Václav Havel's The Memorandum, and Edward Bond's The Sea.  His music for the production of Milan Stitt's The Runner Stumbles was described by the New York Times as "Precise and evocative... wistful, ringing melodies”.

Awards and honors 
In 2012, Joseph was nominated for an IFMCA Award for 'Breakthrough Film Composer of the Year' by the International Film Music Critics Association 
In 2013, Joseph was nominated for Discovery of the Year for Oblivion at the World Soundtrack Academy Awards in Ghent, Belgium.
In 2013, Joseph was nominated for the ASCAP Composers’ Choice Award for the movie Oblivion.
In 2015, Joseph was nominated for Best Original Song Written for a Film from Insurgent for the song "Carry Me Home" at the World Soundtrack Academy Awards 
In 2015, Joseph won the Black Reel Award for Outstanding Score for the film Straight Outta Compton.
In 2018, Joseph was nominated for a Saturn Award for Best Music for The Greatest Showman (shared with John Debney)

Education 
Trapanese completed his bachelor's degree in composition at the Manhattan School of Music, and later an M.A. in Music for Visual Media at UCLA, with support from the Henry Mancini fund.  Joseph's tutors included Giampaolo Bracali, Bruce Broughton, Paul Chihara, Roger Bourland, Jack Smalley, and Martin Bresnick, and he also engaged in brief studies with Louis Andriessen, Aaron Jay Kernis, Julia Wolfe, Mark Snow, and Ira Newborn. From 2008 to 2011, Trapanese taught the Electronic Music and Composition curriculum at UCLA's Herb Alpert School of Music.

Filmography

Film

Television

Video games

References

External links 

 
 

1984 births
21st-century American composers
21st-century American conductors (music)
21st-century American male musicians
21st-century classical composers
21st-century classical trombonists
American classical composers
American classical trombonists
American conductors (music)
American contemporary classical composers
American electronic musicians
American film score composers
American male classical composers
American male conductors (music)
American male film score composers
American music arrangers
American music educators
American people of Italian descent
American television composers
Classical musicians from New Jersey
Composers for trombone
Concert band composers
Electronic composers
Living people
Male television composers
Male trombonists
Manhattan School of Music alumni
Musicians from Jersey City, New Jersey
Record producers from New Jersey
UCLA School of the Arts and Architecture alumni
Video game composers